Clicks & Cuts (stylised as clicks_+_cuts) is a compilation album released by Mille Plateaux in 2000. It is the first volume in the label's Clicks & Cuts series of albums focusing on glitch music.

AllMusic describes the album as "an effort to both investigate and define the glitch aesthetic", then in its formative stages, as well as the style's "official genesis" and "the touchstone upon which later volumes and successive generations would build." In 2017, Pitchfork placed it at number 21 on its list of "The 50 Best IDM Albums of All Time".

Track listing

References

External links
 

2000 compilation albums
Record label compilation albums
Electronic compilation albums